The Federação Amazonense de Futebol (English: Football Association of Amazonas state) was founded on September 26, 1967, and it manages all the official football tournaments within the state of Amazonas, which are the Campeonato Amazonense and the Campeonato Amazonense lower levels, and represents the clubs at the Brazilian Football Confederation (CBF).

References

Amazonense
Football in Amazonas (Brazilian state)
Sports organizations established in 1967